Kate Atkinson (born 28 June 1972) is an Australian film, television and theatre actress. She is best known for her roles on television series SeaChange as police officer Karen Miller and Offspring as Renee. Since 2013, she has appeared in a regular role in Wentworth as Deputy Governor (later Governor) Vera Bennett.

Atkinson has also had regular roles in the television series Fat Cow Motel, Blue Heelers, The Cooks and Kath & Kim. Film roles include Japanese Story, The Hard Word and The Jammed.

Biography
Atkinson was born in Kalgoorlie, Western Australia, on 28 June 1972 to an English mother and Tasmanian father. She was raised in Perth, Western Australia. She studied English at Curtin University in Perth from 1990 to 1993, earning a BA with a double major in theatre and film and television.

Atkinson appeared in long running drama Wentworth as Vera Bennett from series 1 to the finale in 2021. She reprised the role in 2020 when the series returned to production for series 8. Atkinson appeared in 100 episodes of the show and was a part of the "100 club", alongside co-stars Jacquie Brennan, Katrina Milosevic and Robbie Magasiva. Atkinson revealed in 2021 that she had planned to walk away from acting before she was offered her role in Wentworth.

Atkinson appeared in Underbelly: Vanishing Act as con woman Melissa Caddick. She was cast to the role as Melissa's story was of high public interest at the time. The mini series, which aired over two nights, told the story of Caddick's disappearance. After the show went to air Atkinson said "There was still a lot of hurt" for the victims of Caddick's crimes.

In 2022 Atkinson appeared at the "Wentworth Con" fan convention in Melbourne alongside many others in the Wentworth cast.

Filmography

Film

Television

References

External links 
 
 Kate Atkinson at Sue Barnett & Associates

Australian film actresses
Australian stage actresses
Australian television actresses
Living people
1972 births
Actresses from Perth, Western Australia
People from Kalgoorlie
20th-century Australian actresses
21st-century Australian actresses
Curtin University alumni